Sir John Bolton  (died 11 September 1980) was an accountant and Manx politician.  He played a prominent role in the politics of Tynwald, serving both as a member of the Legislative Council and the House of Keys. From 1967 to 1977, he was the Island's Chairman of the Finance Board, effectively acting as the Chancellor of the Exchequer on the Isle. He was further qualified as a chartered accountant, and applied these skills in his capacity on the Finance Board. Under his stewardship, the Isle of Man underwent significant economic development in the 1970s.  In total, he served in some role on the Executive Council of the Isle of Man for a record tenure of 23 years, thereby marking him as one of the most crucial Manx political figures of recent memory.  He died on 11 September 1980, aged 79.

Governmental positions
Chairman of the Finance Board, 1967-1977
Member of the Executive Council, 1954-1977

Manx politicians
1900s births
1980 deaths
Knights Bachelor
Officers of the Order of the British Empire
Politicians awarded knighthoods